S